Permanon is the trademark name for a line of finishes for hard surfaces developed in Germany by Permanon GmbH and has found applications in marine, transportation, and janitorial/maintenance settings.

History
Since its incorporation in 1997, the company specializes in the research and development of new and highly potential methods to clean and protect surfaces. 
Although production is divided into several segments, in general, it is aimed at prevention of contaminating particles penetrating into the pores of surfaces, and long-term protection of surfaces.

Permanon products with silicon do not undergo any chemical reaction with the material to be coated. 
Through a complex procedure, it was developed to create a static attractive force on all surfaces, without damaging the surface materials.

References

External links
 

Coatings